Michael Wood (born September 4, 1968 ) is a Canadian curler.

Wood skipped his team of Mike Bradley, Todd Troyer and Greg Hawkes to the 1988 Canadian Junior Curling Championships title, defeating Northern Ontario's Craig Kochan in the final. In 1989, this team lost the final at the World Junior Curling Championships to Sweden, skipped by Peja Lindholm.

Nearly two decades later, Wood joined 1990 World Junior Champion Dean Joanisse, and they won the British Columbia provincial championships in 2007. In 2008, Wood left the Joanisse rink.

Wood is a grounds foreman for Oak Bay Parks.

References

External links
World Curling Federation profile

1968 births
Living people
Curlers from Victoria, British Columbia